Harry Kenneth Baker (born 20 September 1990) is an English footballer, who plays for Grays Athletic in the Isthmian League.

Career
Baker made his professional debut on 7 October 2008 in Leyton Orient's Football League Trophy defeat against Brighton & Hove Albion, which was concluded in a penalty shootout.

On 12 January 2010, he joined Grays Athletic on loan, and stayed with the Essex club until 11 February. He was unable to secure a regular place in the first team on his return to Orient, and was released by manager Russell Slade on 9 May 2010.

Baker joined Dover Athletic on 6 August. He made his debut in the 2–2 draw with Welling United on 17 August, and scored his first goal for Dover in the 6–3 victory over Farnborough on 18 September.

Baker signed for Welling United in January 2012, scoring on his debut in the 3–1 league win over Havant & Waterlooville on 21 February.

He signed for then Conference North club Bishop's Stortford in November 2012, where he has played in a variety of positions. In 2014, he signed for Isthmian League Premier Division side Billericay Town.

References

External links
Leyton Orient profile

1990 births
Living people
Footballers from Bexleyheath
English footballers
Association football midfielders
Leyton Orient F.C. players
Grays Athletic F.C. players
Welling United F.C. players
Dover Athletic F.C. players
Bishop's Stortford F.C. players
Billericay Town F.C. players
English Football League players
National League (English football) players
Isthmian League players